Gerd Oswald (June 9, 1919 – May 22, 1989) was a German director of American films and television.

Biography
Born in Berlin, Oswald was the son of German film director Richard Oswald and actress Käthe Oswald. He worked as a child actor before emigrating to the United States in 1938. Early production jobs at low-budget studios like Monogram Pictures prepared Oswald for a directorial career.

Oswald's film credits include A Kiss Before Dying (1956), Valerie (1957), Crime of Passion (1957), Brainwashed (1960), and Bunny O'Hare (1971).

His television credits include Perry Mason, Blue Light, Bonanza, The Outer Limits, The Fugitive, Star Trek, Gentle Ben, It Takes a Thief, Rawhide, and The Twilight Zone (1985 TV series). Fans of Mystery Science Theater 3000 know Oswald as the director of the 1966 film Agent for H.A.R.M.

He was an assistant director for 20 years, including on his father's film The Captain from Köpenick (completed in 1941, but only released in 1945), aka Passport to Heaven and I Was a Criminal.

Oswald was the uncredited second-unit director of The Longest Day (1962) responsible for staging the parachute drop scenes into Sainte-Mère-Église, France on D-Day, during the Normandy landings of World War II.

Oswald died of cancer in Los Angeles, California at the age of 69.

References

Further reading
 Parsons, Louella (November 15, 1970). "Pola Negri to Return to Germany". The Philadelphia Inquirer. p. 10
 
 "A New Star in the TV Heavens: Last-minute coaching". Ebony. January 1967. p. 74
 "Gerd Oswald Forms Own Company". Los Angeles Evening Citizen News. June 7, 1969. p. 10

External links

1919 births
1989 deaths
American film directors
American television directors
American people of Austrian-Jewish descent
Male actors from Berlin
German emigrants to the United States